This article contains information about albums and singles released by Ike & Tina Turner.

Overview 
Tina Turner joined musician and songwriter Ike Turner's band the Kings of Rhythm as a vocalist in 1957. They released their first record together in 1958. Under the name "Little Ann," Tina Turner was featured alongside Ike Turner and fellow Kings of Rhythm vocalist Carlson Oliver on the single "Boxtop."

In 1960, Ike Turner formed the Ike & Tina Turner Revue. Their debut single "A Fool In Love" was released on Sue Records in July 1960. The success of the single was followed by a string of R&B hits within a 2-year span, including "I Idolize You," "It's Gonna Work Out Fine," and "Poor Fool." Between 1960 and 1975, the duo had 20 songs on the Billboard Hot 100 chart which include 1 top 10 hit, and 26 songs on the Billboard Hot R&B chart which include 6 top 10 hits. They also had 12 albums on both the Billboard 200 and Top R&B Albums charts. Ike & Tina Turner had 9 singles chart in the UK, their first was "River Deep – Mountain High" in 1966 and their last being "Baby, Get It On" in 1975. A few years after their dissolution, Ike Turner released "Party Vibes"/"Shame, Shame, Shame" taken from their last recording sessions. The single charted on Billboard's Disco Top 100 in 1980.

Their best-selling single "Proud Mary" and their best-selling album What You Hear Is What You Get, both released in 1971, are certified Gold by the RIAA. Their single "Nutbush City Limits" was certified silver by the BPI in 1973. In 1974, they received the first ever Golden European Award for selling more than one million records of "Nutbush City Limits" in Europe. In 1977, Tina Turner was presented an Australian Platinum Award for the album Nutbush City Limits.

In 2003, Rolling Stone ranked the compilation album Proud Mary: The Best of Ike & Tina Turner No. 212 on their list of the 500 greatest albums of all time (No. 214 on 2012 revised list). In 2017, Pitchfork ranked the album River Deep – Mountain High No. 40 on their list of the 200 Best Albums of the 1960s.

Labels 
After three years with their first label Sue Records, Ike & Tina Turner began recording on Ike Turner's Sonja label in 1963. While releasing singles, the duo also toured extensively. To make sure he always had a record out while on tour, Turner formed various labels to release singles such as Teena, Prann, Innis, Sony and Sonja Records. Between 1964 and 1969, the duo signed with multiple labels, including Warner Bros., Loma, Modern, Kent, Cenco, Philles, Tangerine, Pompeii, Blue Thumb, Minit and A&M. After the success of their single "Come Together," the duo were reassigned to Minit's parent label Liberty Records in 1970. In 1971, Liberty was absorbed into United Artists Records, where Ike & Tina Turner remained for the rest of their tenure together.

Studio albums

Live albums

Selected compilations

Singles

1960s

1970s

1980s

Promo singles

Other appearances

Home videos

See also 

 Songs written by Ike Turner
 Songs written by Tina Turner

Notes

References

Discography
Rock music discographies
Rhythm and blues discographies
Discographies of American artists
Soul music discographies